| tries = {{#expr:
 + 4 + 5 + 4 +10 +6 + 6 + 2 + 5
 + 2 + 7 + 5 + 1 + 4 + 8 + 3 + 4
 + 15 + 7 + 10 + 11 + 5 + 7 + 7 + 6
 + 9 + 11 + 7 + 7 + 7 + 5 + 7+ 3
 + 8 + 5 + 9 + 6 + 7 + 7 + 7 + 5
 + 4 + 8 + 13 + 10 + 3 + 5 + 8 + 6
 + 9 + 7 + 7 + 11 + 7 + 8 + 5 + 7
 + 6 + 8 + 13 + 9 + 8 + 15 + 8 + 7
 + 8 + 7 + 11 + 3 + 9 + 9 + 10 + 9
 + 5 + 8 + 10 + 2 + 4 + 9 + 3 + 8
 + 4 + 11 + 5 + 16 + 4 + 5 + 5 + 6
 + 8 + 11 + 9 + 8 + 10 + 11 + 11 + 4
 + 13 + 10 + 9 + 3 + 9 + 6 + 7 + 6
 + 5 + 3 + 5 + 10 + 10 + 10 + 7 + 7
 + 5 + 8 + 3 + 4 + 11 + 4 + 3 + 8
 + 9 + 5 + 7 + 3 + 4 + 5 + 5 + 7
 + 13 + 14 + 7 + 9 + 4 + 7 + 6 + 3 
 + 8 + 4 + 6 + 14 + 5 + 7
 + 10 + 8 + 7 + 9 + 5 + 10 + 3 + 3
 + 5 + 11 + 8 + 8 + 9 + 9 + 7 + 11
 + 13 + 15 + 7 + 5 + 5 + 10 + 9 + 9
 + 4 + 6 + 9 + 11 + 3 + 6 + 6 + 12
 + 4 + 13 + 6 + 7 + 12 + 8 + 6 + 11
 + 6 + 10
 + 6 + 7 + 5 + 10 + 8 + 9 + 5 + 6
 + 5 + 11 + 7 + 12 + 12 + 7 + 10 + 5
 + 9 + 6 + 8 + 9 + 9 + 10 + 7 + 8
 + 8 + 11 + 7 + 7 + 12 + 5 + 8 + 5
 + 9 + 7 + 12 + 13 + 5 + 12 + 5 + 7
 + 10 + 15 + 7 + 9 + 6 + 7 + 7 + 11
 + 7 + 9 + 10 + 8 + 9 + 7 + 6 + 7
}}
| lowest attendance = 113Loughborough Students v Blaydon (7 January 2017)Loughborough Students v Old Albanian (4 February 2017)
| top point scorer =  Harry Leonard(Rosslyn Park) (265 points)
| top try scorer   =  Jonas Mikalcius (Hartpury College) (34 tries) 
| prevseason       = 2015–16
| nextseason       = 2017–18
}}
The 2016–17 National League 1, known for sponsorship reasons as the SSE National League 1 was the eighth season of the third tier of the English rugby union system, since the professionalised format of the second tier RFU Championship was introduced; and was the 30th season since league rugby began in 1987.

Hartpury College were crowned the champions on 11 March 2017 after winning their 25th match and maintaining their 100% record. The college side went on break more National League 1 records by winning all 30 games and gaining promotion to the highest level in the club's history. Other records by Hartpury included most league points in a season (143), most points scored (1,455), as well as tying with Ealing Trailfinders (2014–15) for most bonus points gained in a season (28).  

Due to London Welsh going into liquidation in January 2017 and being expelled from the RFU Championship, only two teams were relegated from National League 1. On 1 April 2017 newly promoted Macclesfield were the first team to be relegated after they lost 18–21 at home to Plymouth Albion. The second relegation spot was keenly contested and went to the last game of the season with 14th placed Hull Ionians 3 points ahead of 15th placed Blaydon. In the end Blaydon lost their final game while Hull Ionians won theirs to finish 6 points clear. It ended a run of 10 years in the 3rd tier for Blaydon.

Structure
The league consisted of sixteen teams with all the teams playing each other on a home and away basis to make a total of thirty matches each. There was one promotion place with the champions promoted to the Greene King IPA Championship. There are usually three relegation places with the bottom three teams relegated to either National League 2 North or National League 2 South depending on the geographical location of the team. Due to the expulsion of the championship team London Welsh in January 2017, there was no relegation from the championship and subsequently only two teams relegated from this league.

Participating teams and locations

Twelve of the sixteen teams participated in the preceding season's competition. The 2015–16 champions, Richmond, were promoted to the 2016–17 RFU Championship and replaced by Birmingham Moseley (who changed their name from Moseley prior to the season) and were relegated from the 2015–16 RFU Championship. The three teams relegated last season, were Henley Hawks and Cinderford (both to the 2016–17 National League 2 South) and Wharfedale (2016–17 National League 2 North) – with Wharfedale dropping from the third tier for the first time in 20 years. The promoted teams are Cambridge and Macclesfield champions of the 2015–16 National League 2 South and 2015–16 National League 2 North respectively, and Old Albanian who won the promotion play-off against Sedgley Park.

League table

Fixtures

Round 1

Round 2

Round 3

Round 4

Round 5

Round 6

Round 7

Round 8

Round 9

Round 10

Round 11

* Hartpury is the first team (in the top three divisions) to win a bonus point in eleven consecutive matches.

Round 12

Round 13

Round 14

Round 15

Round 16

 Hartpury failed to gain a bonus point for the first time this season.

Round 17

Round 18

Round 19

Round 20

Round 21

Round 22

Round 23

Rescheduled matches (from 14 January)

Round 24

Round 25

With victory Hartpury College are champions.

Round 26

Round 27

Macclesfield are relegated.

Round 28

Round 29

Round 30

Blaydon are relegated.

Attendances

Individual statistics

Top points scorers

Top try scorers

 Jonas Mikalcius scored two tries on 10 December (attributed to Jonas) against Macclesfield but they have not been added to the published tables (officially 34 tries)

 Updated to matches played on 29 April 2017

Season records
 Updated to matches played on 29 April 2017

Team
Largest home win — 85 pts
92 – 7 Hartpury College at home to Macclesfield on 22 April 2017
Largest away win — 65 pts
8 – 73 Coventry away to Old Albanian on 8 April 2017
Most points scored — 92 pts
92 – 7 Hartpury College at home to Macclesfield on 22 April 2017
Most points scored away from home — 73 pts
8 – 73 Coventry away to Old Albanian on 8 April 2017
Most tries in a match — 15
92 – 7 Hartpury College at home to Macclesfield on 22 April 2017
Most conversions in a match — 12
Hartpury College at home to Macclesfield on 22 April 2017
Most penalties in a match — 6
Plymouth Albion at Fylde on 8 October 2016
Most drop goals in a match — 1 (6)
Hull Ionians at home to Darlington Mowden Park on 3 September 2016
Cambridge away to Plymouth Albion, both on 3 September 2016
Cambridge away to Rosslyn Park on 10 September 2016
Blaydon away to Birmingham Moseley on 24 September 2016
Rosslyn Park away to Loughborough Students on 8 October 2016
Blaydon at home to Hull Ionians on 12 November 2016

Attendances
Highest — 2,712
Coventry at home to Birmingham Moseley on 17 December 2016 
Lowest — 113 (2)
Loughborough Students v Blaydon (7 January 2017)
Loughborough Students v Old Albanian (4 February 2017)
Highest average attendance — 1,264
Coventry
Lowest average attendance — 230
Hull Ionians

Player
Most points in a match — 29 (2)
Protheroe for Hartpury College at Cambridge on 28 October 2016
Law for Darlington Mowden Park at home to Fylde on 8 April 2017

Most tries in a match — 3 (25)
Gair Currie for Loughborough Students away to Cambridge on 1 October 2016
Dan George for Blackheath at home to Blaydon on 8 August 2016
Luke Eves for Harpury College at home to Hull Ionians on 8 October 2016
Ed Sheldon for Birmingham Moseley at home to Old Albanian on 22 October 2016
Joe Brown for Esher at home to Blaydon on 22 October 2016
Scott Armstrong for Fylde at home to Hull Ionians on 22 October 2016
Jonas Mikacius for Hartpury College at home to Ampthill on 22 October 2016
Jonas Mikacius for Hartpury College at home to Rosslyn Park on 5 November 2016
Matt Thompson for Blaydon at home to Hull Ionians on 12 November 2016
Caven for Hartpury College at home to Darlingham Mowden Park on 19 November 2016
Ali Thomson for Hull Ionians away to Cambridge on 26 November 2016
Dan Williams for Plymouth Albion home to Hartpury College on 17 December 2016
Matt Thompson for Blaydon at home to Blackheath on 28 January 2017
Andy Radwan for Darlington Mowden Park at Old Albanian on 28 January 2017
Liebeneberg for Cambridge at Macclesfield on 4 February 2017
Peter White for Coventry at home to Hull Ionians on 18 February 2017
Chris Briers for Fylde at Ampthill on 4 March 2017
Andy Radwan for Darlington Mowden Park home to Macclesfield on 4 March 2017
Protheroe for Hartpury College home to Old Albanian on 11 March 2017
Nigel Baker for Ampthill away to Blaydon on 1 April 2017
Garry Law for Darlington Mowden Park at home to Fylde on 8 April 2017
Max Trimble for Coventry at Old Albanian on 8 April 2017
Jonas Mikacius for Hartpury College at home to Macclesfield on 22 April 2017
Callum Irvine for Hull Ionians at home to Old Albanian on 22 April 2017
Jonas Mikacius for Hartpury College away to Blackheath on 29 April 2017
Most conversions in a match — 11
Adam Hastings for Hartpury College at home to Macclesfield on 22 April 2017
Most penalties in a match — 6
Kieran Hallett for Plymouth Albion away to Fylde on 8 October 2016
Most drop goals in a match — 1 (7)
Lee Millar for Hull Ionians at home to Darlington Mowden Park on 3 September 2016
Jack Green for Cambridge away to Plymouth Albion on 3 September 2016
Dan Lewis for Cambridge at Rosslyn Park on 10 September 2016
Nathan Horsfall for Blaydon at Birmingham Moseley on 24 September 2016
Scott Sneddon for Rosslyn Park away to Loughborough Students on 8 October 2016
Ryan Foreman for Blaydon at home to Hull Ionians on 12 November 2016
Callum Irvine for Hull Ionians at home to Cambridge on 1 April 2017

See also
 English rugby union system
 Rugby union in England

References

External links
 NCA Rugby

National
National League 1 seasons